There are Tamil executives and businesspeople throughout the world. The Tamil originate from India’s southern state of Tamil Nadu, the union territory of Puducherry and from Sri Lanka.

Australia 
 Maha Sinnathamby

Hong Kong 
 M. Arunachalam

India 
 Raja Sir Annamalai Chettiar, industrialist, philanthropist & educator who established Annamalai University
 Rajah Sir Muthiah Chettiar, industrialist, philanthropist and first Mayor of Madras
 Alagappa Chettiar (1909–1957), industrialist, philanthropist & educator who established Alagappa University
 M. A. Chidambaram Chettiar, industrialist
 B. S. Abdur Rahman industrialist, educationist
 Ashok Amritraj: Chairman Hyde Park Entertainment-Hollywood
 Rao Sahib A. Y. S. Parisutha Nadar, politician, industrialist, educationist and philanthropist
 Ayya Nadar, founder of Ayyan Group
 Shanmuga Nadar, founder of Standard Fireworks and other firework industries in Sivakasi
 Shiv Nadar, founder and CEO of HCL Technologies
A. C. Muthiah, Chairman of Southern Petrochemical Industries Corporation (SPIC)
 V. G. Panneerdas, founder of VGP Group of Companies
 R. G. Chandramogan, founder of Arun Icecreams
 H. Vasanthakumar, founder of Vasanth & Co and Vasanth TV
 V. R. Muthu, CEO and son of founder of Idhayam oil
 K. P. Kandasamy, founder of Dinakaran
 Arunachalam Muruganantham, founder of Jayashree Industries
 S. P. Adithanar, founder of Dina Thanthi
 N.Mahalingam Gounder, educator, industrialist and philanthropist.
 Kalanidhi Maran, Media Baron.
 M. G. Muthu, founder of MGM Group of Companies and MGM Dizzee World
 M. A. M Ramasamy Chettiar, industrialist, philanthropist and Pro-Chancellor of Annamalai University
 Murugavel Janakiraman founder of Bharat Matrimony world's largest matrimonial website
 Mani Subramanian, CEO of the Keane India Private Limited.
 Karumuttu Thiagarajan Chettiar, industrialist & educationist, founder of erstwhile Bank of Madurai & Thiagarajar College of Engineering
 Palani G. Periasamy, Chairman of PGP Group of Companies
 Sivanthi Adithan
 S. P. Adithanar
 Arcot Narayanaswami Mudaliar
 M. Arunachalam
 K. Pandiarajan
 R. G. Chandramogan
 Anand Amritraj
 Vijay Amritraj
 Kumar Mahadeva
 M. A. M. Ramaswamy
 Kumar Mahadeva
 Malkar Mohamed
 T. N. Manoharan
 Kalanithi Maran
 A. C. Muthiah
 M. G. Muthu
 V. R. Muthu
 Shiv Nadar
 V. G. Panneerdas
 Palani G. Periasamy
 Shanmuga Nadar
 H. Vasanthakumar
 Sarathbabu Elumalai
 N. Subash Chandrabose
 N. Mahalingam
 A. Vellayan
 Avichi Meiyappa Chettiar
 M. Saravanan (film producer)
 Alagappa Chettiar
 Annamalai Chettiar
 Ramaswami Chettiar
 M. A. Chidambaram
 Jeppiaar, politician, industrialist, educationist and philanthropist
 M. Ct. M. Chidambaram Chettyar
 M. Ct. Muthiah Chettiar
 Karumuttu Thiagarajan Chettiar
 M. Anto Peter
R. K. Swamy, advertising executive
T. V. Sundram Iyengar
Venu Srinivasan

Malaysia 
 Ananda Krishnan
 G. Gnanalingam
 Bastianpillai Paul Nicholas
 K. L. Palaniappan
 Vijay Eswaran
 Vinod Sekhar

Sri Lanka 
 Chandran Rutnam
 Ken Balendra
 V. R. M. Letchumanan Chettiar
 Indrajit Coomaraswamy

Singapore 
 Robert Chandran
 Naraina Pillai
 K. Thamboosamy Pillay

United Kingdom 
 Kali Arulpragasam
 Ratheesan Yoganathan
 Subaskaran Allirajah

United States 
 Bhargav Sri Prakash
 Sanjay Kumar
 
 Murugan Pal
 Sundar Pichai
 Navin Selvadurai

See also 
 Tamil people
 List of Tamil people
 List of people from Tamil Nadu
 List of prominent Sri Lanka Tamils

References

 
Tamil